Porcellio gallicus is a species of woodlouse in the genus Porcellio belonging to the family Porcellionidae that can be found in France, Italy, Spain, and Switzerland.

References

Crustaceans described in 1904
Woodlice of Europe
Porcellionidae